This is a list of albums attributed to the anime adaptation of Hayate the Combat Butler.

Opening and ending themes

Hayate no Gotoku!

 is a single by Kotoko released on May 23, 2007 in Japan by Geneon. The song "Hayate no Gotoku!" was the first opening theme to the anime Hayate the Combat Butler that aired with episodes one to twenty-six. The single peaked at 7th place on the Oricon singles charts.

Proof/no vain

Proof/no vain is a single by Mell released on May 30, 2007 in Japan by Geneon. The song "Proof" was the first ending theme to the anime Hayate the Combat Butler that aired with episodes one to thirteen.

Get my way!

Get my way! is a single by Mami Kawada released on August 8, 2007 in Japan by Geneon. The song "Get my way" was the second ending theme to the anime Hayate the Combat Butler aired from episode fourteen to twenty-six.

Shichiten Hakki Shijōshugi!

 is a single by Kotoko released on October 17, 2007 in Japan by Geneon. The song "Shichiten Hakki ☆ Shijōshugi!" is the second opening theme to the anime Hayate the Combat Butler which began airing at episode twenty-seven.

Chasse

Chasse is a single by Kaori Utatsuki that was released on November 21, 2007 in Japan by Geneon. The song "Chasse" is the third ending theme to the anime Hayate the Combat Butler which began airing at episode twenty-seven.

Oto no nai Yozora ni/Ko no me kaze

 is IKU's debut single released on March 19, 2008 in Japan by Geneon. The song "Ko no me kaze" is the fourth ending theme to the anime Hayate the Combat Butler which began airing at episode forty.

Soundtracks

Original Soundtrack 1

The Hayate the Combat Butler Original Soundtrack 1 is the first soundtrack to the anime version of Hayate the Combat Butler released by Geneon on June 22, 2007. The soundtrack is composed and arranged by Kōtarō Nakagawa.

Original Soundtrack 2

The Hayate the Combat Butler Original Soundtrack 2 is the second soundtrack to the anime version of Hayate the Combat Butler that was released by Geneon on February 22, 2008. The soundtrack is composed and arranged by Kōtarō Nakagawa.

Audio dramas

Drama CDs

Hermione Ayasaki and the Private Lessons

Hayate the Combat Butler Drama CD 1: Hermione Ayasaki and the Private Lessons is the first drama CD based on the anime version of the series Hayate the Combat Butler. It was first released on August 24, 2007 by Geneon.

Hakuo Gakuin Bus Tour and Maria Talking to Herself

Hayate the Combat Butler Drama CD 2: Hakuo Gakuin Bus Tour and Maria Talking to Herself is the second drama CD based on the anime version of the series Hayate the Combat Butler. It was scheduled for release on February 22, 2008 but it was later changed to March 7, 2008 by Geneon.

First Love

Hayate the Combat Butler Drama CD 3: First Love is the third drama CD based on the anime version of the series Hayate the Combat Butler. It was released on March 21, 2008 by Geneon.

Gōgō Seitokai Tenkenjā VS Kyōfu no Donperi Kaijin Yukijin

 is a promotional released drama CD  released through the magazine Shōnen Sunday based on the anime version of the series Hayate the Combat Butler!.

Radio CDs

Radio the Combat Butler Volume 1

Radio the Combat Butler Volume 1 is the first compilation of the web radio show Radio the Combat Butler, featuring Rie Kugimiya, the voice actor for Nagi Sanzenin, Ryōko Shiraishi, the voice actor for Hayate Ayasaki, and occasionally replacing Ryoko Shiraishi, Rie Tanaka, the voice actor for Maria. It was released by Geneon on September 21, 2007 on two CDs. The first CD contains new recordings that never aired and the second CD contains thirteen episodes of the web radio show that aired between April 6, 2007 and June 29, 2007.
Track Listing

Radio the Combat Butler Volume 2

Radio the Combat Butler Volume 2 is the second compilation of the web radio show Radio the Combat Butler, featuring Rie Kugimiya and Ryōko Shiraishi, the voice actor for Nagi Sanzenin and Hayate Ayasaki respectively. It was released by Geneon on December 21, 2007. Like the first volume, volume two is two disks. The first CD contains new recordings and the second CD contains thirteen web radio episodes that aired between July 6, 2007 and September 28, 2007 in mp3 format.

Track Listing

Character song albums
Twelve music albums for Hayate the Combat Butler have been released featuring songs sung by the voice actors for not only the main cast, but also from the supporting cast of characters. The first two albums, released on May 25, 2007, include songs by Ryōko Shiraishi as Hayate Ayasaki and Rie Tanaka as Maria. The next two, released on July 25, 2007, include songs by Rie Kugimiya as Nagi Sanzenin and Shizuka Itō as Hinagiku Katsura. Volumes five and six, released on September 21, 2007, contained songs by Miyu Matsuki as Isumi Saginomiya and Kana Ueda as Sakuya Aizawa. Volume seven, released on November 21, 2007, contained songs by Marina Inoue as Wataru Tachibana and Saki Nakajima as Saki Kijima, while volume eight released on the same day contained songs by Mikako Takahashi as Ayumu Nishizawa. Album number nine, released on January 25, 2008, includes songs by Hitomi Nabatame as Yukiji Katsura, and volume ten released on the same day is a trio between Eri Nakao, Sayuri Yahagi, and Masumi Asano as Miki Hanabishi, Izumi Segawa, and Risa Asakaze respectively. The eleventh release, on March 21, 2008, is another album by Rie Kugimiya, and the twelfth album, released on the same day, is a duet with Rie Tanaka and Shizuka Itō.

References

Anime soundtracks
Film and television discographies
Hayate the Combat Butler
 
Discographies of Japanese artists